USS R-14 (SS-91) was an R-class coastal and harbor defense submarine of the United States Navy.

Construction and commissioning
R-14′s keel was laid down by the Fore River Shipbuilding Company, in Quincy, Massachusetts, on 6 November 1918. She was launched on 10 October 1919, sponsored by Ms. Florence L. Gardner, and commissioned on 24 December 1919.

Service history

1919–1929
After a shakedown cruise off the New England coast, R-14 moved to New London, Connecticut, where she prepared for transfer to the United States Pacific Fleet. In May 1920, she headed south. Given hull classification symbol "SS-91" on 17 July 1920, she transited the Panama Canal in the same month and arrived at Pearl Harbor in the Territory of Hawaii on 6 September 1920. There, for the next nine years, she assisted in the development of submarine warfare and anti-submarine warfare tactics, and participated in search and rescue operations.

Since the submarine's electric motors did not have enough battery power to propel her to Hawaii, the ship's engineering officer, Roy Trent Gallemore, came up with a novel solution to the problem. Lieutenant Gallemore decided they should try to sail the submarine to the port of Hilo, Hawaii. He therefore ordered a foresail made of eight hammocks hung from a top boom made of pipe bunk frames lashed firmly together, all tied to the vertical kingpost of the torpedo loading crane forward of the submarine's superstructure. This added  to the speed. He then ordered a mizzen made of eight blankets hung from another top boom made of bunk frames, all tied to the vertically placed boom of the torpedo loading crane. This sail added another . Around 12:30 on 12 May 1921, Gallemore was able to begin charging the submarine's batteries. After 64 hours under sail at slightly varying speeds, R-14 entered Hilo Harbor under battery propulsion on the morning of 15 May 1921. Douglas received a letter of commendation for the crew's innovative actions from his submarine division commander, Commander Chester W. Nimitz, USN.

1930–1946
On 12 December 1930, R-14 departed Pearl Harbor for the last time and headed back to the Atlantic. Proceeding via San Diego, California, and the Panama Canal, she returned to New London on 9 February 1931, and through the end of the 1930s conducted training exercises for the Submarine School. In the spring of 1941, she moved down the United States East Coast to Key West, Florida, her home port as of 1 June 1941. In the fall of 1941, she returned to New London for overhaul and on 22 November 1941 resumed operations from Key West. Into April 1945, she conducted training exercises for the Sound School and patrolled the Yucatán Channel and the Florida Straits. On 29 June 1943, United States Army Coast Artillery Corps guns at Fort Zachary Taylor mistook R-14 for a German U-boat and opened fire on her while she was off Key West, but she suffered no damage.

On 25 April 1945, R-14 departed Key West and headed north, and in early May 1945 she arrived at Philadelphia, Pennsylvania. She was decommissioned on 7 May 1945, struck from the Naval Vessel Register on 19 May 1945, and sold on 28 September 1945 to Rossoff Brothers of New York City. She was later resold to the Northern Metals Company of Philadelphia and was scrapped in 1946.

Notes

References

Citations

Bibliography
 Hinman, Charles R., and Douglas E. Campbell. The Submarine Has No Friends: Friendly Fire Incidents Involving U.S. Submarines During World War II. Syneca Research Group, Inc., 2019. .

External links
 
 1939 Photos of R-14 from Life Magazine
 R Boats at PigBoats.com

Ships built in Quincy, Massachusetts
United States R-class submarines
World War II submarines of the United States
1919 ships
United States submarine accidents
Maritime incidents in 1921
Maritime incidents in June 1943
Friendly fire incidents of World War II